Andrei Stepanov (born April 14, 1986) is a Belarusian professional ice hockey player who is currently playing for HC Dinamo-Molodechno of the Belarusian Extraleague (BXL).

He participated at the 2011 IIHF World Championship as a member of the Belarus men's national ice hockey team.

External links

1986 births
Belarusian ice hockey forwards
Expatriate ice hockey players in Russia
HC Sibir Novosibirsk players
Living people
Ice hockey people from Moscow
Yunost Minsk players
Amur Khabarovsk players
Krylya Sovetov Moscow players
HC Lada Togliatti players
Torpedo Nizhny Novgorod players
HC MVD players
HC Vityaz players
Metallurg Novokuznetsk players
HC Neftekhimik Nizhnekamsk players
HC Dinamo Minsk players